House No. 44 is a 1955 Hindi film directed by M. K. Burman and produced by Dev Anand for his banner Navketan Films. The movie stars Dev Anand and Kalpana Kartik in a lead role. The film is also noted for its popular songs with music by S. D. Burman, with lyrics by Sahir Ludhianvi, including "Teri Duniya Mein Jeene Se" and "Chup Hai Dharti Chup Hain Chand Sitaare", sung by Hemant Kumar.

Plot
Ashok works for the notorious gangster Sunder and his men. One day, he comes across a dead body and he reports it to the police. Ashok then meets Nimmo and falls in love with her. Nimmo asks Ashok to leave the life of a gangster and settle down with her. Ashok agrees, but after a few days of not having any food, Ashok realizes that he was better off being a gangster. The rest of the movie portrays the struggle of Ashok trying to stay with Nimmo or with Sunder.

Cast

 Dev Anand as Ashok
 Kalpana Kartik as Nimmo
 K. N. Singh as Captain
 Bhagwan Sinha as Sunder
 Rashid Khan as Jiboo
 Kumkum in song Dekh idhar o jaadugar
 Sheela Vaz as dancer in hotel
 Kammo as Jiboo's daughter
 Shivraj as Nimmo's father and chowkidar
 Sarita
 Prabhu Dayal
 Ratan Gaurang as poor man in restaurant

Songs
The film's music score was given by S. D. Burman, with lyrics by Sahir Ludhianvi

References 

 Cinema Modern: Navketan Story, by Sidharth Bhatia. Harpercollins, 2011. .

External links

1955 films
1950s Hindi-language films
Indian black-and-white films
Indian thriller films
Films scored by S. D. Burman
1950s thriller films
Hindi-language thriller films